Hyper distribution or hyperdistribution is the distribution of content (particularly video) over the Internet using technologies such as BitTorrent. A speech given by Mark Pesce of "Piracy Is Good?", delivered on May 6, 2005 at the Australian Film Television and Radio School in Sydney defines the term.

References

Distributed data storage